XHNTV-TDT, virtual channel 8, is a television station in Tepic, Nayarit, Mexico. The station is owned by Radio-Televisión Digital de Nayarit, S.A. de C.V., and broadcasts as 8 NTV from the Cerro Loma Batea tower farm in Tepic.

A second station, XHRTNA-TDT (RF 27), is to be built to repeat 8 NTV programming for Acaponeta and Tecuala. It will broadcast from a tower between the two cities used by radio stations XHETD-FM and XHLH-FM.

History
XHNTV-TDT (originally XHRTTS-TDT) and XHRTNA-TDT were awarded in the IFT-6 television station auction of 2017. RTDN is owned by journalist Antonio Tello, who had run the NTV online news site. The Tepic station began commercial operation April 29, 2019, with XHRTTS having been assigned new XHNTV-TDT call letters on April 26.

Subchannels
In August 2019, the IFT approved the addition of Multimedios Televisión and Milenio Televisión as subchannels of XHNTV.

References 

2019 establishments in Mexico
Television channels and stations established in 2019
Television stations in Nayarit